"Jungle" is a song by Taiji, released on July 15, 2000. The CD was released with his autobiography, Uchuu o Kakeru Tomo e: Densetsu no Bando X no Sei to Shi.

Track listing
Music and lyrics by Taiji.
"Jungle" - 05:49

References 

2000 songs